Pythium buismaniae is a plant pathogen infecting Primula.

External links
 Index Fungorum
 USDA ARS Fungal Database

Water mould plant pathogens and diseases
Ornamental plant pathogens and diseases
buismaniae